In physics and geometry, the nodary is the curve that is traced by the focus of a hyperbola as it rolls without slipping along the axis, a roulette curve. 

The differential equation of the curve is:
.

Its parametric equation is:

The surface of revolution is the nodoid constant mean curvature surface.

References

Plane curves